Nigg is an area of Aberdeen, Scotland, south of the River Dee. It has a population of 16,500 (2019 estimate). The area has a bay known as the Bay of Nigg or Nigg Bay, immediately south of a coastal golf course, and a farm that is also a visitor attraction, known as Doonies Farm.

History
Nigg is situated somewhat to the east of the ancient Causey Mounth trackway, which route was constructed on high ground to make passable this medieval passage from coastal points south of Stonehaven to Aberdeen. This ancient passage connected the River Dee crossing (where the present Bridge of Dee is situated) via Muchalls Castle and Stonehaven to the south. The route was that taken by William Keith, 7th Earl Marischal and the Marquess of Montrose when they led a Covenanter army of 9000 men in the battle of the Civil War in 1639.

Until 1975 Nigg was administered by the county council of Kincardineshire.  When county councils were abolished in that year, Nigg was added to the City of Aberdeen.

See also
Cove Bay
Hare Ness

References

Areas of Aberdeen